FC Metalist Sevastopol (Futbol′nyy klub Metalist Sevastopol) was a football team based in Sevastopol, Ukrainian SSR.

History
The club appeared sometime after 1954 and existed until mid 1980s. The club represented the ship repair yard "Metalist" located in Balaklava.

Honors
Ukrainian championship for collective teams of physical culture (Soviet Lower League Tier)
  1965, 1966

Crimean Oblast football championship (Soviet Lower League Tier)
  1961, 1965, 1966, 1982

League and cup history (Soviet Union)
{|class="wikitable"
|-bgcolor="#efefef"
! Season
! Div.
! Pos.
! Pl.
! W
! D
! L
! GS
! GA
! P
!Domestic Cup
!colspan=2|Europe
!Notes
|- bgcolor=SteelBlue
|align=center|1965
|align=center|4th KFK Ukrainian SSR Gr. 1
|align=center bgcolor=gold|1/5
|align=center|8
|align=center|6
|align=center|0
|align=center|2
|align=center|15
|align=center|6
|align=center|12
|align=center|
|align=center|
|align=center|
|align=center bgcolor=gold|Final (1st, Winners)
|- bgcolor=SteelBlue
|align=center|1966
|align=center|4th KFK Ukrainian SSR Gr. 1
|align=center bgcolor=gold|1/5
|align=center|8
|align=center|7
|align=center|1
|align=center|0
|align=center|11
|align=center|6
|align=center|15
|align=center|
|align=center|
|align=center|
|align=center bgcolor=gold|Final (1st, Winners)
|- bgcolor=SteelBlue
|align=center|1967
|align=center|4th KFK Ukrainian SSR Gr. ?
|align=center colspan=8|...
|align=center|
|align=center|
|align=center|
|align=center|Final (6th)
|-
|align=center colspan=14|...
|- bgcolor=SteelBlue
|align=center|1970
|align=center|5th KFK Ukrainian SSR Gr. 3
|align=center|3/8
|align=center|14
|align=center|7
|align=center|1
|align=center|6
|align=center|12
|align=center|12
|align=center|15
|align=center|
|align=center|
|align=center|
|align=center|
|}

Coaches
 1962–1963 Pavel Sklyarov
 1965–1966 Anatoliy Zakharov
 1975–1978 Anatoliy Dyomin
 1979–1982 Vladimir Golubev

See also
 FC Sudnostroitel Sevastopol

References

External links
 Metalist Sevastopol. lena-dvorkina.narod.ru

Defunct football clubs in Sevastopol
Defunct football clubs in the Soviet Union
Association football clubs established in the 1950s
Association football clubs disestablished in the 1980s
1950s establishments in Ukraine
1980s disestablishments in Ukraine